A Dear Fool is a 1921 British silent comedy film directed by Harold M. Shaw and starring George K. Arthur, Edna Flugrath and Edward O'Neill. It was based on a novel by Arthur T. Mason. An ambitious young Fleet Street reporter is sent to discover the identity of a reclusive new playwright.

Cast
 George K. Arthur - John Denison
 Edna Flugrath - Viva Hamilton
 Edward O'Neill - Stephen Blair
 Bertie Wright - Sir John Boscatel
 Vera Tyndale - Lady Boscatel
 C. Tilson-Chowne - Oliver Chambers
 Mabel Archdale - Sylvia Polesworthy

References

External links

1921 films
1921 comedy films
British comedy films
Films based on British novels
Films directed by Harold M. Shaw
Films set in London
British black-and-white films
British silent feature films
1920s English-language films
1920s British films
Silent comedy films